Chenali-ye Bala (also Romanized as Chenālī-ye Bālā) is a village in Surak Rural District, Lirdaf District, Jask County, Hormozgan Province, Iran. At the 2006 census, its population was 112, in 26 families.

References 

Populated places in Jask County